Zhengitettix is an Asian genus of ground-hoppers (Orthoptera: Caelifera) in the subfamily Scelimeninae and not assigned to any tribe.

Species 
Zhengitettix includes the species:
Zhengitettix albitarsus Storozhenko, 2013
Zhengitettix curvispinus Liang, Jiang & Liu, 2007
Zhengitettix extraneus Storozhenko, 2013
Zhengitettix hainanensis Liang, 1994 - type species
Zhengitettix hosticus Storozhenko, 2013
Zhengitettix mucronatus Storozhenko, 2013
Zhengitettix nigrofemurus Deng, Zheng & Wei, 2010
Zhengitettix obliquespicula Zheng, Jiang & Liu, 2005
Zhengitettix palawanensis Storozhenko, 2013
Zhengitettix ruangsuwani Dawwrueng & Doodduem, 2014
Zhengitettix spinulentus Storozhenko, 2013
Zhengitettix taytayensis Storozhenko, 2013
Zhengitettix transpicula Zheng & Jiang, 2002
Zhengitettix triangulari Zheng, Zeng & Ou, 2010

References

External links 
 

Tetrigidae
Caelifera genera
Orthoptera of Indo-China